The year 1677 in science and technology involved some significant events.

Astronomy
 Publication of the first English star atlas, John Seller's Atlas Coelestis.

Mathematics
 Publication of Cocker's Arithmetick: Being a Plain and Familiar Method Suitable to the Meanest Capacity for the Full Understanding of That Incomparable Art, As It Is Now Taught by the Ablest School-Masters in City and Country, attributed to Edward Cocker (died 1676). It will remain a standard grammar school textbook in England for more than 150 years.

Medicine
 January 21 – A pamphlet on smallpox published in Boston becomes the first medical publication in the British colonies in North America.

Microbiology
 Antonie van Leeuwenhoek discovers the spermatozoon.

Paleontology
 Robert Plot publishes The Natural History of Oxford-shire, Being an Essay Toward the Natural History of England, in which he describes the fossilised femur of a human giant, now known to be from the dinosaur Megalosaurus.

Births
 February 8 – Jacques Cassini, French astronomer (died 1756)
 September 17 – Stephen Hales, English physiologist and clergyman (died 1761)
 September 27 – Johann Gabriel Doppelmayr, German mathematician, astronomer and cartographer (died 1750)

Deaths
 May 4 – Isaac Barrow, English mathematician (born 1630)
 May 23 (bur.) – John Kersey, English mathematician (born 1677)
 October 11 – Sir Cornelius Vermuyden, Dutch-born drainage engineer (born 1595).
 October 14 – Francis Glisson, English physician (born 1599?)

References

 
17th century in science
1670s in science